Hank! is a studio album by country music artist Hank Thompson and His Brazos Valley Boys. It was released in 1957 by Capitol Records (catalog no. T-826).

In the annual poll by Billboard magazine of country music disc jockeys, Hank! ranked as the No. 3 album of 1957. The album's popularity extended into 1958, and it still ranked No. 7 in the 1958 poll.

AllMusic gave the album a rating of four stars. Reviewer Bruce Eder wrote: "The band was nearing its peak from this point in its history."

Track listing
Side A
 "Hang Your Head in Shame"
 "String of Pearls"
 "The Gypsy"
 "You'll Be the One"
 "Don't Be That Way"
 "Ole Napoleon"

Side B
 "I Don't Want to Know"
 "Prosperity Special"
 "Someone Can Steal You from Me"
 "Don't Look Now"
 "Across the Valley from the Alamo"
 "Don't Get Around Much Anymore"

References

1957 albums
Hank Thompson (musician) albums
Capitol Records albums